The 1947–48 Oberliga  was the third season of the Oberliga, the first tier of the football league system in the three western zones of Allied-occupied Germany. The league operated in six regional divisions, Berlin, North, South, Southwest (north and south) and West. For the Northern division, the Oberliga Nord, and the Western division, the Oberliga West, it was the inaugural season, the leagues having been created in 1948. The champions and runners-up of the US, British and French occupation zones and the champions of Oberliga Berlin entered the 1948 German football championship, the first edition of the German championship after the Second World War, which was won by 1. FC Nürnberg. It was 1. FC Nürnberg's seventh national championship.

In the British occupation zone the best four teams each of the Oberliga Nord and Oberliga West played out a zone championship with the two finalists advancing to the German championship.

In the US occupation zone the champion and runners-up of the Oberliga Süd directly advanced to the German championship.

In the French occupation zone the Oberliga Südwest operated in two regional divisions, north and south, with a championship final at the end of season. At the end of the season the four clubs in the league from the Saar Protectorate left the German league system with the Saar clubs returning three seasons later, in 1951. The Saar clubs entered the new Ehrenliga Saarland, with the exception of 1. FC Saarbrücken who joined the French Ligue 2 instead. Eventually, on 1 January 1957, the Saar Protectorate would officially join West Germany, ending the post-Second World War political separation of the territory from the other parts of Germany.

In the Soviet occupation zone an Eastern zone championship, the 1948 Ostzonenmeisterschaft, was held and won by SG Planitz, but its winner, also invited, was not permitted to travel to the German championship.

In post-Second World War Germany many clubs were forced to change their names or merge. This policy was particularly strongly enforced in the Soviet and French occupation zones but much more relaxed in the British and US one. In most cases, clubs eventually reverted to their original names, especially after the formation of the Federal Republic of Germany in 1949.

British occupation zone

Oberliga Nord
The 1947–48 season was the inaugural season of the league.

Oberliga West
The 1947–48 season was the inaugural season of the league.

Championship
The British occupation zone championship saw the best four teams in the two Oberligas compete against each other. The two finalists, both from Hamburg, would advance to the German championship. Like in 1947 Hamburger SV won the second and last edition of this competition.

Quarter-finals

|}

Semi-finals

|}
Replay

|}

Final

|}

Oberliga Berlin
The 1947–48 season saw three new clubs promoted to the league, SG Spandau-Altstadt, Union Oberschöneweide and VfB Pankow.

Oberliga Südwest

Northern group
The 1947–48 season saw five new clubs promoted to the league, SpVgg Andernach, VfL Neustadt, Saar 05 Saarbrücken, FK Pirmasens and SG Gonsenheim.

Southern group
The 1947–48 season saw four new clubs promoted to the league, Eintracht Singen, SpVgg Trossingen, SV Laupheim and Fortuna Freiburg.

Finals
The winners of the two regional divisions of the Oberliga Südwest played a final to determine the league champion who was also directly qualified for the German championship:

|}

The runners-up of the two divisions determined the club who would face the loser of the championship final for the second place in the German championship:

|}

|}

Oberliga Süd
The 1947–48 season saw four new clubs promoted to the league, VfB Mühlburg, Rot-Weiß Frankfurt, FC Wacker München and Sportfreunde Stuttgart.

German championship

The 1948 German football championship was contested by the eight qualified Oberliga teams and won by 1. FC Nürnberg, defeating 1. FC Kaiserslautern in the final. It was played in a knock-out format and consisted of eight clubs. The champion of the Soviet occupation zone was however not permitted to travel to Stuttgart to play 1. FC Nürnberg, with the game awarded to the latter.

References

Sources
 30 Jahre Bundesliga  30th anniversary special, publisher: kicker Sportmagazin, published: 1993
 kicker-Almanach 1990  Yearbook of German football, publisher: kicker Sportmagazin, published: 1989, 
 DSFS Liga-Chronik seit 1945  publisher: DSFS, published: 2005
 100 Jahre Süddeutscher Fußball-Verband  100 Years of the Southern German Football Federation, publisher: SFV, published: 1997

External links
 The Oberligas on Fussballdaten.de 

1947-48
1
Ger